Hippola was a town of ancient Laconia, a little north-west of the promontory of Taenarum, in ruins in the time of Pausanias (2nd century). It contained a temple of Athena Hippolaitis.

Its site is located near the modern Kipoula.

References

Populated places in ancient Laconia
Former populated places in Greece